The Hunkies are a Polish hardcore band founded in 2003. Some of the members are also playing in The Analogs band.

Members 
Paweł Czekała ("Piguła") - bass guitar
Paweł Boguszewski ("Dmuchacz") - drums
Piotr Skotnicki ("Skoda") - guitar
"Mały Piotruś" - guitar
"Nemeczek" - vocals

Discography
 Sprawiedliwość, 2003
 To co nas łączy, 2004

Notes
Split CD with fellow Polish punk band Eye For An Eye.

References
Jimmy Jazz Records

Polish hardcore punk groups